The Incredulity of Saint Thomas is a painting of the subject of the same name. One of the most famous paintings by the Italian Baroque master Caravaggio,   . There are two autograph versions of Caravaggio's "The Incredulity of Saint Thomas", an ecclesiastical "Trieste" version for Girolamo Mattei (Giovanni Baglione) now in a private collection and a secular "Potsdam" version for Vincenzo Giustiniani (Pietro Bellori) that later entered the Royal Collection of Prussia and survived the Second World War unscathed and can now be admired in the Palais at Sanssouci, Potsdam.

It shows the episode that gave rise to the term "Doubting Thomas" which, formally known as the Incredulity of Thomas, had been frequently represented in Christian art since at least the 5th century, and used to make a variety of theological points. According to the Gospel of John, Thomas the Apostle missed one of Jesus's appearances to the Apostles after his resurrection, and said "Unless I see the nail marks in his hands and put my finger where the nails were, and put my hand into his side, I will not believe it." A week later, Jesus appeared and told Thomas to touch him and stop doubting. Then Jesus said, "Because you have seen me, you have believed; blessed are those who have not seen and yet have believed."

The two pictures show in a demonstrative gesture how the doubting apostle puts his finger into Christ's side wound, the latter guiding his hand. The unbeliever is depicted like a peasant, dressed in a robe torn at the shoulder and with dirt under his fingernails. The composition of the picture is such that the viewer is directly involved in the event and feels the intensity of the process.

It should also be noted that in the ecclesiastical version of the unbelieving Thomas, Christ's thigh is covered, whereas in the secular version of the painting, Christ's thigh is visible.

The light falling on Christ emphasises his physicality and at the same time suggests his divinity and significance to the viewer. Caravaggio was a master of light and shadow, and he uses this chiaroscuro to create a narrative through line in this piece. The shadows (representing doubt) sweep over St. Thomas, but as he touches Christ he is drawn into the light. As always, Caravaggio's work brings biblical scenes to life in a way that all the pageantry in the world cannot. It is an imaginative and moving approach to the subject that also underlines Caravaggio's artistic mastery. The two autograph works of Caravaggio's Unblinking Thomas differ in that Christ's thigh is uncovered in the Potsdam secular version and covered by the white cloak in the Trieste ecclesiastical version. The Potsdam painting has already been restored and is also in warmer tones, somewhat smaller in size, the folds of the red robe are missing at the bottom, the space above the heads is smaller and Christ's elbow is cut off.

Analysis
The paintings features heavy chiaroscuro. Thomas's face shows surprise as Jesus holds his hand and guides it into the wound. The absence of a halo emphasizes the corporeality of the risen Christ. Behind Thomas are two other apostles, probably Saint Peter and Saint John the Evangelist. Peter is subject of other works by Caravaggio, namely the Crucifixion of Saint Peter (1601) and The Denial of Saint Peter (1610).

Caravaggio, in the horizontal dimension of the canvas, "photographs" the moment of observation in a three-quarter frame in which he arranges the four figures on a neutral and dark background. This allows the viewer's attention to be focused on Thomas' head, while the light illuminates Christ's forehead, profile and clear side, allowing us to draw attention to the anxious and unsettled posture of Thomas, who is being comforted by Christ and to whom he bends his head.
The close arrangement of the four heads and a triangle of gazes, with the focus on Thomas' gesture, allows for a further emotional concentration of the viewer's gaze, which can now focus on the centre of the "drama": the revelation of the real presence in the flesh of Jesus. Caravaggo shows the apostle Thomas who, following a certain iconographic tradition, sticks a finger into Jesus' spear wound while two other apostles observe the scene.
The facial expression of Christ can only be compared in simplicity and beauty to Leonardo's Mona Lisa. Also on the compositional level we observe the intersection of two main axes, the horizontal one consisting of the arm of Thomas and the hands of Jesus and the vertical one running from the head of the two apostles (or better between both heads) and continuing exactly at the neck of the apostle Thomas. This arrangement is rounded off by an arch formed by the two backs of Thomas and Christ: An admirable interlocking of human forms "thrown" into the foreground, with great emotional impact. The gesture of Thomas and the hand of Christ that accompanies him explode in an extraordinary "zoomata", enhanced by the light coming from the left (the light of Revelation) that illuminates the doubt, the astonishment (in the fronts of the apostles) and the reality of the living flesh of the Saviour.

Painters came to Rome, especially from the Netherlands, to study Caravaggio's work. Rembrandt, who never visited Italy, became acquainted with Caravaggio's painting style through the Utrecht Caravaggists. He can also be regarded as a representative of Caravaggism, albeit a rather late one. His turn to a radical realism, which he adhered to until the end of his life, is hardly conceivable without the example of Caravaggio and his successors. This also applies to Rembrandt's use of light. Caravaggio's paintings also left a deep impression on Peter Paul Rubens. Among the painters influenced by Caravaggio, apart from the Utrecht Caravaggists, are Orazio Gentileschi, Artemisia Gentileschi, Bartolomeo Manfredi, Georges de la Tour, Rembrandt van Rijn, Jusepe de Ribera and Johann Ulrich Loth. Caravaggio's influences are also evident in paintings by Jan Vermeer, Diego Velázquez and Francisco de Zurbarán.

This pictorial motif is probably related to Saint Matthew and the Angel (1602) and the Sacrifice of Isaac (1603), all having a model in common. The Potsdam painting belonged to Vincenzo Giustiniani before entering the Prussian royal collection, surviving the Second World War intact.

History

Potsdam Version (Secular) 
In 1606, the banker Vincenzo Giustiniani mentioned this subject in a copy in Genoa, and twenty years later the painting was mentioned in the inventory of the Giustiniani collection, suggesting that the banker himself commissioned the work, a hypothesis confirmed in some sources.

Incidentally, the sombre realism of the work could only have been welcomed by one of Caravaggio's greatest followers. From the Giustiniani inventory of 1638 we learn that there is "in the Stanza Grande de Quadri Antichi...un quadro sopraporto di mezze figure con l'Historia di San Tomasso che toucca il Costato di Christo col dito depito in tela alto pal. 5 pal.larg.6 by the hand of Michelangelo da Caravaggio with a black frame profiled and guilloché with gold" Bellori wrote of the Potsdam painting in 1672: "St Thomas placing his finger in the wound at the Lord's side, placing his hand close to the wound and exposing his breast with a cloth, removing it from the stern". After the dispersal of the Giustiniani collection, the painting was sent to Prussia and purchased by the state in 1816, taken to Charlottemburg Palace and later to the Picture Gallery in Potsdam, where it remains today.

Trieste Version (Ecclesiastical) 
Giovanni Baglione mentioned in 1642 in his report (p. 137) that the Mattei family[3] was the patron of this Trieste Version of Doubting Thomas. Michelangelo Merisi da Caravaggio was the guest of the brothers Ciriaco Mattei and Cardinal Girolamo Mattei in the latter's family palace (today Caetani in Via delle Botteghe Oscure, Roma) from 1601 to 1603. It may be believed that Mattei actually commissioned such a subject from the artist, "Doubting Thomas", in the form of a Counter-Reformation trilogy, together with "The Capture of Christ" (now in the Irish National Gallery in Dublin) and "The Last Supper at Emmaus" (now in the National Gallery, London). According to the inventory list of 19.11.1608, the first owner was the French ambassador Philippe de Béthune, Count of Selles, minister of King Henry IV. During the Revolution, the painting was confiscated. Traces of the Trieste painting have been lost since the castle of Selles-sur-Cher, after various inheritances. This "Mattei copy" is then found in the 19th century in the possession of the Tsar in the collection of the Hermitage in the Russian Embassy in Rome. In 1918, in the course of the liquidation of the entire embassy inventory in Rome, the painting was then sold at a private auction with lot number 728. The painting then ended up in Trieste with the founder of Banca Intesa Sanpaolo and was sold to a private collection in Austria in 2019. According to historical research by Prof. Dr. Maurizio Marini and Dr. Dario Succi, Sir Denis Mahon, Prof. Mina Gregori, Dr. Federica Gasparrini , Mag. Maria Ranacher, Dr. Michela Fasce as well as Dr. Roberta Lapucci, this painting is an autograph version by Caravaggio with the collaboration of his master student named Prospero Orsi.

The Pentimenti in the Trieste version   
With the help of the latest examination techniques, it was possible to observe the changes in the design between the first drawing phase and the second painting phase. Interestingly, in addition to the four figures in the final painting, the original composition contained two others that almost formed a pyramid and filled the upper part in a scenic third plane. These two men, who were present in the planning phase, were excluded from the final composition of the painting and obscured by the brown background. In the figure on the far right, there is remorse in the eye and in the slipping of the cheek. Originally this face was positioned more than three-quarters of the way up; in the final version it is in profile. Diagnostic examinations of the Trieste version have also revealed several other "pentimento" that rule out the possibility that it could be a contemporary replica. They testify to the hesitations and changes made to the composition by the artist Caravaggio during the painting process and therefore reveal that it is an original work from Caravaggio's hand. The pentimenti are numerous and visible to the naked eye and with UV rays, IR rays or X-rays and are an essential source for the working process of this painting, which now allows us to disprove all theories that this painting is a copy.

Current condition of the painting of the Trieste version   
In 2022, the painting "Doubting Thomas" was subjected to a necessary cleaning and elaborate examinations in Florence. The result: the pentimenti discovered during the cleaning carried out on the present painting confirm that it is probably even the first version of Caravaggio's interpretation of this theme.

The technical and radiographic analyses and X-ray examination have revealed pentimenti (not simple corrections) to such an extent that even the hypothesis that it is a copy seems unthinkable. The proof that it is an original by Caravaggio is also quite clear from the transparency profile.  The diagnostic examinations of the painting revealed very interesting aspects regarding the painting technique. And in this sense, the process of the painter appears clearly legible, able to develop the drawing and adapt it to the creative impulse that manifests itself free from the constraints of a predefined design, while the composition gradually adapts to the limits of the canvas to better convey the emotions of the story to the viewer. We are therefore not dealing with simple pentimenti, but with a genuine plastic and poetic redefinition of the entire painting. This therefore completely rules out the possibility of a copy. In short, according to some leading Caravaggio scholars such as Mina Gregori, Denis Mahon, Maurizio Marini, documentary research, diagnostic studies, i.e. a stylistic and formal analysis without prejudice, and looking at the painting itself, not an often poor photographic reproduction, all these elements converge to consider this painting as an autograph by Merisi. In any case, this is an original of outstanding quality. "An imitator does not make changes, he copies."

The closed, elliptical structure of the central composition is similar to that of other works from the period between 1600 and 1602, such as the one entitled "The Entombment of Christ".

A final remark concerns the so-called "rescue technique" that Caravaggio used to depict the abrasions of some fragments: It consists in using the underlying preparation of the canvas as paint and making it visible with a particularly effective "brick-red" effect. These are features that can only be found in a prototype and not in a replica or, least of all, in a copy, and are thus further proof of the autography of this work. The technique of this painting, revealed in its exceptional quality, develops through overlapping layers of colour that underline a clear, explanatory project. As far as the purely technical aspects of the execution are concerned, it was noted that the painting has a support made of a single canvas whose texture, in terms of the number of threads, appears identical to that of "Saint John the Baptist" in the Capitoline Art Gallery when compared by X-ray. The Trieste version "The Incredulity of Saint Thomas" is published in the Maurizio Marini corpus catalogico "Caravaggio - Pictor praestantissimus" Newton & Compton - 2005 in position Q50. The painting is declared as "d'interesse artistico e storico" by the "Ministero per i Beni e le Attività Culturali Sopraintendenza Regionale del Friuli - Venezia Giulia".

See also
List of paintings by Caravaggio

References

External links
Page at www.wga.hu

Paintings by Caravaggio
1600s paintings
Paintings depicting Jesus
Paintings about death
Christian art about death
Paintings depicting Thomas the Apostle
Paintings in Potsdam